Delton Dwayne Hall (born January 16, 1965) is a former professional American football cornerback in the National Football League (NFL). He played for the Pittsburgh Steelers (1987–1991) and the San Diego Chargers (1992)

Hall was drafted by the Pittsburgh Steelers in the 2nd round (38th overall) of the 1987 NFL Draft—following the Steelers' pick of Rod Woodson (CB) in the 1st round. In his rookie year, he became an instant starter at cornerback, intercepting three passes on the way to earning Steelers' "Rookie of the Year" honors and the nickname "Beltin' Delton" from fans of the team.

Hall also was a standout in track and field setting the North Carolina state 400 meters record at the NCHSAA Track Championships held at North Rowan High School in 1983.  His time of 46.41 (electronic timing) remains the second fastest ever recorded by an NC high schooler.

References

1965 births
Living people
Players of American football from Greensboro, North Carolina
American football cornerbacks
Clemson Tigers football players
Pittsburgh Steelers players
San Diego Chargers players
Grimsley High School alumni